The House Order of the Golden Lion was an order of the German Landgraviate and Electorate of Hesse-Kassel and later, the Grand Duchy of Hesse and by Rhine. It was first instituted in 1770 by Landgrave Frederick II, in honour of and under the patronage of Saint Elizabeth of Hungary, an ancestor of the House of Hesse, and was intended to award auspicious merit.

Overview 
Initially conferred in one class (Knight), the order was revised in 1815 by Landgrave William IX (later William I, Elector of Hesse), who added the grades of Grand Cross and Commander. It was further expanded in 1818 with William splitting the Commander grade into two separate classes; thus, the order had the grades of Grand Cross, Commander 1st Class, Commander 2nd Class and Knight. It reverted to a single-class order on 20 August 1851 when Elector Frederick William I founded the Wilhelmsorden, which was created from the latter three classes. Membership of the Order of the Golden Lion was then restricted to 41 knights, including the princes of the electoral family (who were inducted into the order from birth).

In the wake of the Austro-Prussian War in 1866, Hesse-Kassel – who had sided with Austria – was annexed into Prussia, with the Order of the Golden Lion and all electoral orders of chivalry incorporated into the Prussian honours system. With the death of Frederick William I with no legitimate heirs, the main line of the Electoral House of Hesse-Kassel became extinct, and the orders were subsequently abolished on 27 August 1875. The order was later resurrected as the "Grand Ducal Hessian Order of the Golden Lion" by Louis III, Grand Duke of Hesse in October 1875, as a single-class order below that of the Ludwig Order. It was thereafter awarded to members of the Grand Ducal House and foreign royalty, as well as the high nobility.

The Order of the Golden Lion ceased to be a state order in 1918 with all grand ducal orders, following the defeat of Germany in World War I and the abdication of the last Grand Duke. It currently survives as a dynastic order of the House of Hesse.

Insignia 
 The badge consists of a crowned golden lion within a golden oval hoop on the obverse with the motto: "Virtute et Fidelitate", and on the lapel with the inscription:
 I. Model: "Fridericus II D. G. Hassiae Landgravius inst. 1770."
 II. Model: "Wilhelmus I Hassiae Elector 1803".
 The ribbon is crimson in the widths for the sash, neck cross (commander) and pectoral cross (knight).
 The collar, which was worn on special occasions, consisted of golden lions alternating with medallions with the inscription "FL".

The knights wore this medal on a crimson ribbon, hanging from the right shoulder to the left hip, and also on the left breast an eight-pointed silver star embroidered with rays, in the center of which on a blue handle with the red background and silver embroidered motto.

Recipients

Electoral order

 Adolphe, Grand Duke of Luxembourg
 Prince Albert of Prussia (1837–1906)
 Albert of Saxony
 Prince Alexander of Hesse and by Rhine
 Alexander II of Russia
 Arthur Wellesley, 1st Duke of Wellington
 Burkhard Wilhelm Pfeiffer
 Prince Charles of Prussia
 Christian IX of Denmark
 Ernest Augustus, Crown Prince of Hanover
 Ernest Augustus, King of Hanover
 Ferdinand I of Austria
 Franz Joseph I of Austria
 Friedrich, Duke of Schleswig-Holstein-Sonderburg-Glücksburg
 Frederick III, German Emperor
 Frederick Francis II, Grand Duke of Mecklenburg-Schwerin
 Prince Frederick William of Hesse-Kassel
 Frederick William, Grand Duke of Mecklenburg-Strelitz
 Duke Georg August of Mecklenburg-Strelitz
 Prince Frederick of the Netherlands
 Prince Friedrich Karl of Prussia (1828–1885)
 Prince George, Duke of Cambridge
 Georg II, Duke of Saxe-Meiningen
 Prince George of Prussia
 George, King of Saxony
 Prince Heinrich of Hesse and by Rhine
 Baron Karl Ludwig von der Pfordten
 Konstantin of Hohenlohe-Schillingsfürst
 Leopold I of Belgium
 Leopold II of Belgium
 Louis III, Grand Duke of Hesse
 Louis IV, Grand Duke of Hesse
 Luitpold, Prince Regent of Bavaria
 Otto von Bismarck
 William I, German Emperor
 William II, Elector of Hesse
 William III of the Netherlands

Grand ducal order

 Adolphus Cambridge, 1st Marquess of Cambridge
 Adolphus Frederick V, Grand Duke of Mecklenburg-Strelitz
 Alexander Frederick, Landgrave of Hesse
 Alexandra of Denmark
 Alexandra Feodorovna (Alix of Hesse)
 Princess Alexandra of Saxe-Coburg and Gotha
 Alfred, Duke of Saxe-Coburg and Gotha
 Princess Alice of Battenberg
 Prince Andrew of Greece and Denmark
 Princess Anna of Montenegro
 Princess Anna of Prussia
 Princess Augusta of Cambridge
 Princess Beatrice of the United Kingdom
 Bruno, Prince of Ysenburg and Büdingen
 Chlodwig, Landgrave of Hesse-Philippsthal-Barchfeld
 Edward VII
 Edward VIII
 Princess Eleonore of Solms-Hohensolms-Lich
 Princess Elisabeth of Hesse-Kassel
 Princess Elisabeth of Hesse and by Rhine (1864–1918)
 Ernest Louis, Grand Duke of Hesse
 Ernest, Landgrave of Hesse-Philippsthal
 Prince Frederick Charles of Hesse
 Frederick William III, Landgrave of Hesse
 George V
 Prince Henry of Prussia (1862–1929)
 Princess Irene of Hesse and by Rhine
 Julia, Princess of Battenberg
 Prince Louis of Battenberg
 Louise of Hesse-Kassel
 Grand Duchess Maria Alexandrovna of Russia
 Princess Marie of Battenberg
 Princess Marie Luise Charlotte of Hesse-Kassel
 Marie of Romania
 Princess Margaret of Prussia
 Mary of Teck
 Nicholas II of Russia
 Grand Duke Sergei Alexandrovich of Russia
 Otto Graf zu Stolberg-Wernigerode
 Princess Victoria of Hesse and by Rhine
 Princess Victoria Melita of Saxe-Coburg and Gotha
 Victoria, Princess Royal
 Queen Victoria
 Wilhelm II, German Emperor

References

Literature
Maximilian Gritzner, "Handbuch der Ritter- und Verdienstorden". Leipzig. 1893.

Orders of chivalry of Germany
House of Hesse-Darmstadt
House of Hesse-Kassel
Orders, decorations, and medals of Hesse
1770 establishments in the Holy Roman Empire
Awards established in 1770
Orders of chivalry awarded to heads of state, consorts and sovereign family members